Ribautia aggregata is a species of centipede in the Geophilidae family. It is endemic to Australia, and was first described in 1915 by French myriapodologist Henry Wilfred Brolemann. Females of this species have 67 to 71 pairs of legs and are about 50 mm long.

Distribution
The species occurs in New South Wales.

Behaviour
The centipedes are solitary terrestrial predators that inhabit plant litter, soil and rotting wood.

References

 

 
aggregata
Centipedes of Australia
Endemic fauna of Australia
Fauna of New South Wales
Animals described in 1915
Taxa named by Henry Wilfred Brolemann